Singham Returns is a 2014 Indian Hindi-language action film directed by Rohit Shetty as the second installment of his Cop Universe. Produced jointly by Reliance Entertainment, Rohit Shetty Picturez and Ajay Devgn FFilms, it serves as a sequel to Singham (2011). Ajay Devgn reprises his role as DCP Bajirao Singham, while Kareena Kapoor portrays the female lead replacing Kajal Aggarwal. It is written by Yunus Sajawal and Sajid-Farhad. The movie's plot is loosely based on Ekalavayan.

Released worldwide on Indian Independence Day 2014, Singham Returns broke various opening day records and was a widespread success with domestic collection of 1.4 billion and worldwide earnings of more than 2.19 billion. Devgn reprised his role through a cameo appearance in the next films of Shetty's Cop Universe: Ranveer Singh's Simmba (2018) and Akshay Kumar's Sooryavanshi (2021).

Plot 
Bajirao Singham, who is now a DCP, gets transferred to Mumbai and discovers that one of his team members, Mahesh Jadhav, is found dead inside an ambulance with massive bags of money. Singham decides to unearth the truth behind it and in this process, he collides with a powerful and fraudulent religious leader, Satyaraj "Babaji" Chander, who has high-profile connections with corrupt politicians, including the ruling party's secretary minister Prakash Rao. During this period, Gurukant "Guruji" Acharya, the veteran leader of the ruling party who has been a teacher to Chief Minister Vikram Adhikari and Singham, is killed by Babaji's henchmen due to Guruji's opposition to Rao's scheme, even though Singham was present at the scene, making him vow vengeance. Because of this, he has to pretend that he has resigned in front of his family. Due to this, his father Manikrao asks him and his childhood friend, Avni Kamat, to come to their home town, Shivgarh. 

After some time, Singham and Avni fall in love with each other. However, it is then revealed that Singham hasn't resigned and came to Shivgarh on an undercover mission to find evidence against Babaji. When they get back to Mumbai, Babaji starts threatening Singham's family. On the other hand, Rao harms all of Guruji's candidates, including Avni, because her in-hiding brother Kishore is one of the candidates. Singham manages to save everyone but before they resign, one of Babaji's henchmen, Altaf Khan, wakes up from a coma and testifies against him. Singham arrests Babaji and Rao. However, some party workers execute an attack outside the court, killing the witnesses. This causes Babaji and Rao to go scot-free. Singham and his team reach their house without wearing their police uniforms, joined in by police from all around Mumbai. 

They successfully fight Babaji and Rao's men. Singham's team storm inside Babaji's house, and comically torture Babaji and Rao by firing a live round into both of their buttocks each. The wounded and humiliated Rao and Baba tell the truth, their confessions secretly being filmed and broadcast on live television and radio. A few weeks later, Guruji's party wins the elections. While being transported to jail in a van, Rao and Baba once again threaten and taunt Singham. Suddenly, the van stops and the driver walks away. A water tanker crashes into the van, sending it into a power station, killing both of them. One of Singham's allies, Inspector Dev Phadnis tells the media that there was a brake failure, and the incident is deemed as an accident (a plan that was fabricated by Singham which resembled the way Mahesh was killed).

Cast 

 Ajay Devgn as DCP Bajirao  Singham IPS
 Kareena Kapoor Khan as Avni Kamat, Bajirao's love interest
 Amole Gupte as Satyaraj Chander a.k.a. "Babaji", A fake religious leader and Prakash Rao's boss
 Anupam Kher as Gurukant Acharya a.k.a. "Guruji"
 Dayanand Shetty as Senior Inspector Daya
  as Inspector Dev Phadnis
 Zakir Hussain as Minister Prakash Rao
 Mahesh Manjrekar as Chief Minister Vikram Adhikari
 Sonalee Kulkarni as Menka Reddy, Bajirao's childhood friend
 Jitendra Joshi as Ashish Kumar, Menka's boyfriend
 Sameer Dharmadhikari as Kishore Kamat, Avni's brother & candidate of Guruji's political party
 Deepraj Rana as Rtd. Cpt. Sunil Prabhat, A candidate of Guruji's political party
 Sharat Saxena as Mumbai Police Commissioner Shiv Rathod
 Ashwini Kalsekar as Journalist Meera Shorey
 Govind Namdev as Manikrao 'Manya' Singham, Bajirao's father
 Meghna Vaidya as Lata Singham, Bajirao's mother
 Uday Tikekar as Avni & Kishore's father
 Shubhangi Latkar as Avni & Kishore's mother
 Pankaj Tripathi as Altaf Khan, A member of Babaji's illegal business
 Sachin Nayak as Bhola Singh
 Shriswara as Neeta Parmar, a television actress and member of Guruji's political party
 Rakesh Kukreti as Mr. Parmar, Neeta's husband
 Ganesh Yadav as Head-Constable Mahesh Jadhav
 Sarita Joshi as Mrs. Jadhav, Mahesh's mother
 Smita Tambe as Usha Jadhav, Mahesh's wife
 Ujjawal Gauraha as News Reporter
Krishna Kotian as a Police constable
Ashish Warang as a Sub-Inspector
Umakant Patil as an Assistant Sub-Inspector
 Amit Verma as Engineer Mayank Anand, The NRI candidate of Guruji's political party

Production 
Director Rohit Shetty announced his thoughts on making a sequel to one of his finest movies Singham (2011). After filming Chennai Express with Shah Rukh Khan, Shetty reportedly has begun filming for Singham 2 with the lead star Ajay Devgn. Filming was expected to go on floors by December 2013 after Shetty's Chennai Express was released, starting the work of Singham 2's pre-production along with that of his another film which incidentally is a sequel too, Golmaal 4.

However, Devgn, the lead of the film, canned 20 days of photography for his other film Action Jackson, directed by Prabhu Deva and start another leg of the shoot from 10 November 2013. After several delays owing to Devgn's shooting of Action Jackson concurrently the principal photography for a 15-day schedule of the film started from 15 May 2014 in Goa. The shoot was held in few places like streets of Siolim, a village located at a distance of about 25 Kilometres from Panaji. The ones which were held in Panaji were mostly indoor ones.

Soundtrack 

The soundtrack for the film was composed by Jeet Gannguli, Meet Bros Anjjan, Ankit Tiwari and Yo Yo Honey Singh. All the composers composed one song each. The soundtrack album contains four songs and one remix. The first single track "Kuch Toh Hua Hai" sung by Ankit Tiwari and Tulsi Kumar was released on 25 July 2014. Another single "Aata Majhi Satakli" sung and composed by Yo Yo Honey Singh was released on 1 August 2014. The soundtrack album was released by T-Series on 7 August 2014.

Track listing

Reception 
Before its release on the eve of Independence Day on 15 August, a right-wing Hindu organisation, HJS wrote to the CBFC asking that the film be banned on grounds of the depiction of Hindu saints in a bad light thereby hurting the religious sentiments. Shetty denied the allegation stating that he has never made anything controversial in his career.

Singham Returns received mixed reviews from Indian critics. It holds a rating of 27% on review aggregator Rotten Tomatoes Taran Adarsh of Bollywood Hungama gave it 4 stars and said "The film is a complete mass entertainer with power-packed drama, hi-intensity dialogue and towering performances as its aces. The brand value attached to it coupled with a long weekend will help the film reap a harvest and rule the box office in days to come." Rohit Khilnani of India Today gave 3 stars and said "Singham Returns is strictly for fans". Anupama Chopra of Hindustan Times gave the film 2.5 out of 5 stars and said, "This is one of Shetty's least cartoonish films. Which doesn't mean he's going for Ardh Satya-style realism. We’ve still got the signature cars blowing up and some terrific action sequences on the streets of Mumbai. But these sequences have a gritty texture." Shweta Kaushal of Hindustan Times gave two stars and said "Watch Singham Returns for the action, not comedy". Mohar Basu of Koimoi gave 2.5 stars and said "Ajay Devgan and the thrills his punches manage to evoke but the wafer thin plotline, hammy acting, predictable narrative and the lack of fun and excitement that drives a Rohit Shetty film". Shubra Gupta of the Indian Express gave 1.5 stars and said "The sequel to 'Singham' is chock full of the usual car on jeep action. Explosions go off at regular intervals. Shootouts – one really well shot – occur frequently." Rajeev Masand of CNN-IBN gave 2.5 stars and said "The predictable story tires you out eventually". Raja Sen of Rediff gave the film 2.5 out of 5 stars and said, "The problem with Singham (and, for that matter, any of these uninteresting modern day star-vehicles) is that the hero roams about unchallenged, unopposed, unexciting. The hero himself ain't bad – for whatever that's worth. Ajay Devgn wears his scowl like a wrestler would wear a championship belt, proud and unsmiling. He's got a fine, old-school swagger and his ass-kicking looks relatively authentic."

Box office 

Game 
An official game based on this film has been released by Zapak Mobile Games Pvt. Ltd, for Android mobile phone users.

Sequel
Director Rohit Shetty has confirmed that there will be a third film in the series after the release of Sooryavanshi, with Devgn reprising his role. In December 2022, it was announced that Deepika Padukone will portray the female lead in the movie which is called Singham Again. Jackie Shroff will return as his role from Sooryavanshi as Omar Hafeez.

Spin-offs

Simmba

The 2018 film Simmba, a Hindi adaptation of the Telugu film, Temper, is a spin-off of Singham. Simmba stars Ranveer Singh in the titular role as Inspector Sangram Bhalerao aka Simmba, a corrupt cop who after the murder of a girl, changes to honesty, and is directed by Rohit Shetty and produced by Karan Johar's Dharma Productions. It also stars Sara Ali Khan and Sonu Sood in its lead roles while Devgn reprises his role of DCP Bajirao Singham from the previous films.

Sooryavanshi

The 2021-film, Sooryavanshi, is another spin-off of this film. This film stars Akshay Kumar as another DCP named Veer Sooryavanshi who joins hands with Simmba and Singham to stop a terrorist attack on Mumbai. This film was again directed by Shetty, produced by Johar, Shetty and Reliance Entertainment. Unlike the three previous films, this film had an original story.

References

External links 
 
 
 

Ajay Devgn
2014 action films
2014 films
Films set in India
Cop Universe
2010s Hindi-language films
Indian sequel films
Fictional portrayals of the Maharashtra Police
Films directed by Rohit Shetty
Indian action films
Films scored by Ankit Tiwari
Reliance Entertainment films
Hindi-language action films